Founded in 2003, the Wireless Broadband Alliance (WBA) undertakes programs and activities to address business and technical issues, as well as opportunities, for member companies. WBA work areas include standards development, industry guidelines, trials, certification and advocacy. Its key programs include Next Gen Wi-Fi, OpenRoaming, 5G, IoT, Testing & Interoperability, and Policy & Regulatory Affairs, with member-led Work Groups dedicated to resolving standards and technical issues.

Membership and governance 

WBA’s membership includes major operators, service providers & industry players and other major companies from around the world. 

WBA Board has 13 representatives from operators and non-operators groups, and is elected bi- annually. JR Wilson, Vice President, Tower Strategy and Roaming, AT&T Services, Inc, was re-elected WBA Chairman in January 2020 to a two-year term.

WBA’s members are major operators, identity providers and leading technology companies across the Wi-Fi ecosystem with the shared vision.

Collaborations 

The WBA works with the Wi-Fi Alliance to promote ease of use on and roaming between wireless hotspots.

The WBA also has ongoing partnerships with the following organizations:

 CableLabs
 GSMA
 3GPP
 OnGo Alliance
 HTNG
 LoRa Alliance
 Multefire Alliance
 Open Connectivity Foundation
 Small Cell Forum

See also 
 Wireless Broadband
 WiMAX

References 

Organizations established in 2003
Broadband
Wi-Fi